Pineh Kuh may refer to:
 Pineh Kuh, Lorestan